Hutton Hall may refer to:
Hutton Castle, also known as Hutton Hall, a castle in Berwickshire, Scotland
Hutton Hall (Guisborough), a house near Guisborough, North Yorkshire, England
Hutton Hall, a building in Penrith, Cumbria, England 
Hutton Hall, a Grade II* listed building in Brentwood, Essex, England
Hutton Hall, Hutton, Lancashire, former building in Hutton, Lancashire, England
GWR 5957 Hutton Hall, a steam locomotive of the GWR 4900 class 

Architectural disambiguation pages